Leto is an unincorporated community in northwestern Hillsborough County, Florida,  United States.  Along with Egypt Lake, it is a part of the census-designated place (CDP) of Egypt Lake-Leto. It was a separate CDP from 1970 to 1990, and was known as West Park in 1990. The population as of the 1990 census was 10,347.

ZIP code 
The ZIP code for Leto is 33614.

Geography

Leto is located at 28 degrees north, 82.5 degrees west (28.011, -82.517); or approximately five miles northwest of Tampa. The elevation for the community is 45 feet above sea level.

Leto boundaries include Tampa International Airport to the south, Egypt Lake to the east, Carrollwood to the north, and Town 'n' Country to the west.

Major surface roads in Leto
Some of the major surface roads serving the community include:
Dale Mabry Highway
Waters Avenue
Lambright Street

Education
The community of Leto is served by Hillsborough County Schools. Leto High School is located within the community.

References

External links
Leto profile from Hometown Locator

Unincorporated communities in Hillsborough County, Florida
Former census-designated places in Hillsborough County, Florida
Unincorporated communities in Florida
Former census-designated places in Florida